Ilovka is a rural locality (a selo) and the administrative center of Ilovskoye Rural Settlement, Alexeyevsky District, Belgorod Oblast, Russia. The population was 352 as of 2010. There are 33 streets.

Geography 
Ilovka is located 11 km north of Alexeyevka (the district's administrative centre) by road. Podseredneye is the nearest rural locality.

References 

Rural localities in Alexeyevsky District, Belgorod Oblast
Biryuchensky Uyezd